Emil Frederiksen (born 5 September 2000) is a Danish professional footballer who plays as a midfielder for Danish 1st Division club SønderjyskE.

Honours
SønderjyskE
Danish Cup: 2019–20

References

Living people
2000 births
Association football midfielders
Danish men's footballers
Danish expatriate men's footballers
SC Heerenveen players
SønderjyskE Fodbold players
Danish Superliga players
People from Viborg Municipality
Danish expatriate sportspeople in the Netherlands
Expatriate footballers in the Netherlands
Sportspeople from the Central Denmark Region